Bonka Dimova (born 15 March 1956) is a Bulgarian sprinter. She competed in the women's 4 × 400 metres relay at the 1980 Summer Olympics.

References

1956 births
Living people
Athletes (track and field) at the 1980 Summer Olympics
Bulgarian female sprinters
Olympic athletes of Bulgaria
Place of birth missing (living people)
Olympic female sprinters